Robbins Airport is a small private airfield north of Medicine Bow, Wyoming. It is owned and operated by Dale Robbins.

References

External links
 SkyVector Airport Page
 AirNav Airport Page

Airports in Wyoming